Samuel C. Parks (March 25, 1820 – February 8, 1917) was an American lawyer and jurist who practiced law with Abraham Lincoln, and was later appointed to serve as a Justice of three different territorial supreme courts by three different presidents, serving on the predecessors to the Idaho Supreme Court (from 1862 to 1865), the New Mexico Supreme Court (from 1878 to 1882), and the Wyoming Supreme Court (from January 11, 1882 to April 14, 1886).

Early life, education, and career
Born in Middlebury, Vermont, to B. Parks, a professor at Indiana University. Parks himself graduated from Indiana University in 1838.

Soon after his graduation, in 1840, Parks moved to Springfield, Illinois, where he taught school for six years, received an M.A. from Jacksonville College in 1844, and read law. He became junior member of Abraham Lincoln's law firm. He was became one of Lincoln's closest friends, the pair often traveling the Illinois circuit together.

Political activities
Parks became active in Illinois politics, serving as a school commissioner, and as a member of the 1848 Illinois Constitutional Convention. In 1855, he was elected to serve in the Illinois House of Representatives. Parks attended both the 1856 and 1860 Republican National Conventions, and was instrumental in having Lincoln nominated for the presidency, primarily by canvassing his native state of Vermont.

In 1863, President Lincoln appointed him as the first Associate Justice of the newly-established Territorial Idaho Supreme Court. He resigned from the court in 1865, following the death of one of his children in Illinois. Parks was also a delegate to the 1870 Illinois Constitutional Convention.

In 1878, President Rutherford B. Hayes appointed Parks as a justice of the New Mexico Supreme Court, and he held that position until 1882, when at the request of Parks, President Chester A. Arthur transferred him to the Wyoming Supreme Court. He served on the latter court until 1886, and afterwards served on the State Board of Pardons of Kansas and a court referee in Cleveland, Ohio.

Death
He died at the home of his daughter, Mrs. H. D. Lee, of Kansas City, Missouri. At the time of his death, at age 97, he was Indiana University's oldest living alumnus. By coincidence he was laid to rest on the anniversary of the birthday of Abraham Lincoln.

References

1820 births
1917 deaths
People from Middlebury, Vermont
U.S. state supreme court judges admitted to the practice of law by reading law
Indiana University alumni
School board members in Illinois
Members of the Illinois House of Representatives
United States Article I federal judges appointed by Abraham Lincoln
Justices of the Idaho Supreme Court
United States Article I federal judges appointed by Rutherford B. Hayes
Justices of the New Mexico Supreme Court
United States Article I federal judges appointed by Chester A. Arthur
Justices of the Wyoming Supreme Court